Randy Costa (born July 6, 1994) is an American professional mixed martial artist who formerly competed in the Bantamweight division. A professional since 2018, he most notably fought in the Ultimate Fighting Championship.

Background

Costa began to box in the sixth grade and then got into kickboxing in the eighth grade. He later wrestled for Taunton High School as a junior in the 160-pound weight class. Adding the element of jiu-jitsu, Costa began training for an MMA career during the summer between his junior and senior years at Taunton High. Costa was a student-athlete at Taunton High. He played football as a freshman, sophomore, and junior. Costa was selected as the Defensive Player of The Game following the Tigers' 35-7 Thanksgiving Day win over Coyle-Cassidy in 2010 at Aleixo Stadium.

Mixed martial arts career

Early career

Starting his professional career in 2018, Costa fought only for the Cage Titans organization, compiling a perfect 4–0 record with all the wins coming via stoppage in the first round.

Ultimate Fighting Championship

Costa made his UFC debut against Brandon Davis on April 13, 2019 at UFC 236. He lost the fight via a rear-naked choke submission in the second round.

Costa faced Boston Salmon on October 18, 2019 at UFC on ESPN: Reyes vs. Weidman. He won the fight via TKO in the first round.

Costa faced Journey Newson on September 19, 2020 at UFC Fight Night: Covington vs. Woodley He won the fight via knockout in round one. This win earned him his first Performance of the Night award.

As the first bout of his new four-fight contract, Costa was expected to face Trevin Jones on March 6, 2021 at UFC 259. However, Costa withdrew from the bout in mid-February citing injury and was replaced by Mario Bautista.

Costa faced Adrian Yanez at UFC on ESPN: Sandhagen vs. Dillashaw on July 24, 2021. Despite a strong first round for Costa, he lost the fight by technical knockout in round two.

Costa faced Tony Kelley on December 11, 2021 at UFC 269. He lost the fight via TKO in the second round.

Costa faced Guido Cannetti on October 1, 2022 at UFC Fight Night 211. He was submitted by Cannetti via rear-naked choke in the first round.

On October 20, 2022, it was announced that Costa was no longer on the UFC roster.

Personal life

Costa graduated from Taunton High in the spring of 2012 and then headed to Massasoit Community College in Brockton. He transferred to Bridgewater State University where he majored in political science.

Costa's longtime friend and former training partner, Devin Carrier, died in a car crash in 2016 when Carrier was 21 years old. Costa brings a picture of his friend to weigh-ins.

Championships and accomplishments

Mixed martial arts
Ultimate Fighting Championship
Performance of the Night (One time)

Mixed martial arts record

|-
|Loss
| align=center|6–4
|Guido Cannetti
|Submission (rear-naked choke)
|UFC Fight Night: Dern vs. Yan
|
|align=center|1
|align=center|1:04
|Las Vegas, Nevada, United States
|
|-
| Loss
| align=center|6–3
| Tony Kelley
| TKO (elbows)
|UFC 269
|
| align=center|2
| align=center|4:15
|Las Vegas, Nevada, United States
|
|-
|Loss
|align=center|6–2
|Adrian Yanez
|TKO (punches)
|UFC on ESPN: Sandhagen vs. Dillashaw 
|
|align=center|2
|align=center|2:11
|Las Vegas, Nevada, United States
|
|-
| Win
| align=center| 6–1
| Journey Newson
| KO (head kick)
| UFC Fight Night: Covington vs. Woodley
| 
| align=center| 1
| align=center| 0:41
| Las Vegas, Nevada, United States
|
|-
| Win
| align=center| 5–1
| Boston Salmon
| TKO (punches)
| UFC on ESPN: Reyes vs. Weidman
|
|align=Center|1
|align=center|2:15
|Boston, Massachusetts, United States
| 
|-
| Loss
| align=center| 4–1
| Brandon Davis
|Submission (rear-naked choke) 
|UFC 236 
|
|align=center|2
|align=center|1:12
|Atlanta, Georgia, United States
|
|-
| Win
| align=center| 4–0
| Rob Fuller
| TKO (punches)
| Cage Titans 42
| 
| align=center| 1
| align=center| 0:42
| Plymouth, Massachusetts, United States
| 
|-
| Win
| align=center| 3–0
| Chris Thorne
| KO (punches to the body)
| Cage Titans 41
| 
| align=center| 1
| align=center| 1:11
| Plymouth, Massachusetts, United States
|
|-
| Win
| align=center| 2–0
| Kenny Lewis
| KO (head kick)
| Cage Titans 40
| 
| align=center| 1
| align=center| 0:11
| Plymouth, Massachusetts, United States
|
|-
| Win
| align=center| 1–0
| Stacey Anderson
| TKO
| Cage Titans 39
| 
| align=center| 1
| align=center| 0:46
| Kingston, Massachusetts, United States
|

See also 
 List of male mixed martial artists

References

External links 
  
  

1994 births
Living people
American male mixed martial artists
Ultimate Fighting Championship male fighters
Bantamweight  mixed martial artists
Mixed martial artists utilizing kickboxing
People from Taunton, Massachusetts
Mixed martial artists from Massachusetts